Mahardah District is a district (mantiqah) administratively belonging to Hama Governorate, Syria. At the 2004 Census it had a population of 143,953. Its administrative centre is the city of Mahardah.

Sub-districts
The district of Mahardah is divided into three sub-districts or nahiyahs (population according to 2004 official census):
Mahardah Subdistrict (ناحية محردة): population 80,165.
Kafr Zita Subdistrict (ناحية كفر زيتا): population 39,302.
Karnaz Subdistrict (ناحية كرناز): population 25,039.

References